This is a partial list of the largest non-synthetic diamonds with a rough stone (uncut) weight of over 200 carats (40 grams). The list is not intended to be complete – e.g., the Cullinan (formerly Premier) mine alone has produced 135 diamonds larger than 200 carats since mining commenced. De Beers generally does not publish information relating to large diamond discoveries.

See also 
List of diamonds
List of emeralds by size
List of individual gemstones
List of gold nuggets by size
List of sapphires by size

References

External links 

Largest rough diamonds
diamonds
Diamonds
Diamonds, rough